Canadian Disruptive Pattern (CADPAT) is the computer-generated digital camouflage pattern developed for use by the Canadian Armed Forces. Four operational variations of CADPAT have been used by the Canadian Armed Forces: a temperate woodland pattern, an arid regions pattern, a winter operations pattern, and a multi-terrain pattern.

CADPAT was the first digital camouflage pattern to be used operationally, having been issued in 1997 with the Canadian Armed Forces. The pattern became fully standardized within the Canadian Armed Forces by 2002, having completely replaced the olive-drab operational uniforms formerly used by Regular Force units. The multi-terrain CADPAT variant began development in 2019, and is planned to replace the temperate woodland and arid regions CADPAT variations.

History

Canada's desire for a new soldier system dated back to November 1988 and closely followed efforts in many NATO countries. The first research effort, called Integrated Protective Clothing and Equipment (IPCE) Technology Demonstration, was initiated in 1995 but then was cancelled, due to high systems cost and failure to meet the majority of the requirements. Ongoing operations in the mid-1990s led to the creation of the Clothe the Soldier (CTS) Project, which directly addressed the NATO soldier system capability areas of survivability and sustainability. The Canadian Disruptive Pattern was a part of ongoing research and implemented during the CTS Project.

Once CADPAT temperate woodland was finalized, field tests began in 1995. After satisfactory results, CADPAT was adopted by the Canadian Army in 1997; however, testing was not concluded until 2001 once the pattern was trademarked.

The first operational use of the temperate woodland pattern was reported in September 2001 with Canadian soldiers serving in Bosnia and Herzegovina for Palladium Rotation 09. The first operational use of the CADPAT arid regions variant overseas was reported during the War in Afghanistan, when Taliban prisoners of war were seen escorted by armed Canadian commandos in the camo. This nearly made things complicated for the Department of National Defence, since it had said that no Canadian commandos were officially in Afghanistan.

In 2019, tests were conducted for plans to eventually replace the temperate and arid regions patterns in service with the Canadian Armed Forces. Under the Soldier Operational Clothing and Equipment Modernization (SOCEM) project, the Department of National Defence was seeking feedback and advice from users for the trial camouflage known as Prototype J before it made its decision. In 2021, the new multi-terrain CADPAT was selected as the replacement. The new camouflage pattern is expected to be adopted by 2027.

Pattern variations
The Canadian Armed Forces has developed four operational variations of CADPAT: temperate woodland (TW), arid regions (AR), winter operations (WO), and multi-terrain (MT).

The temperate woodland pattern became the standard issue for the Canadian Forces Land Force Command in 2002, with the Canadian Forces Air Command following suit in 2004. In 2021, the Canadian Armed Force selected a new CADPAT variant, multi-terrain pattern, to replace the TW and AR patterns, with both being phased out over the coming years, and the patterned uniform becoming the "daily wear" uniform. It is unclear if the TW and AR patterns will be retained for any operational purposes once the pattern becomes standard issue.

Temperate woodland

The temperate woodland pattern (TW) is designed for use in forest and grassland environments, with its mix of light green, dark green, brown, and black.
The pattern was first introduced in 1996 on the helmet cover for the new CG634 helmet then coming into service. At the same time, the pattern was also introduced on a new soldier's individual camouflage net. The TW pattern provides protection from observation by the naked eye and night vision devices, with the pattern incorporating near-infrared technology at the ink level to help conceal the wearer against near-infrared optical devices. The pattern is optimized for a gate rate of 30 to 350 metres against a 3-power optical sight.

Arid regions

The arid regions pattern (AR) is designed for use in desert, near desert, and savannah conditions, incorporating three shades of brown. The AR pattern also features two additional arm pockets and Velcro on the arms compared to the TW uniform. The AR pattern was developed concurrently with the trials of TW pattern. However, after Canadian Forces were deployed to Afghanistan, the AR pattern was expedited with the intent that it would be issued to soldiers in summer 2002. The AR pattern also incorporates Infra-Red technology for night operation.

Multi-terrain
Beginning in 2019, as part of the Soldier Operational Clothing and Equipment Modernization (SOCEM) programme, a ‘transitional’ pattern began to be tested by the Canadian Armed Forces. The pattern was accepted after some mild alterations to its coloration. The pattern is overall less vibrant than the TW pattern, but darker than the AR pattern, using varying shades of green, brown, tan, and black. In 2021, the new CADPAT pattern, called "multi-terrain pattern" was officially announced as the replacement the TW and AR patterns, although the process will occur over the following decade. The pattern is designed to blend into the widest possible range of environments, and is planned to serve as the day-to-day working uniform of the Canadian Armed Forces.

Winter operations

The winter operations (WO) pattern was created for snow-covered or mixed woodland and snowy terrain. The snow camouflage pattern was introduced as an upgrade to the monochrome winter whites to further enhance the Canadian soldier's camouflage capability by day and night. It also includes Near Infra-Red technology.

Proposed variations
In 2011, Defence Research and Development Canada based at CFB Suffield set forth a requirement to develop a new urban pattern for the Canadian Forces based on the three major metropolitan areas of Canada: Toronto, Vancouver, and Montreal. The prototype pattern is known as the Canadian urban environment pattern (CUEPAT). While at least one company — HyperStealth Biotechnology Corporation — responded to the requirement,  there have been no further announcements regarding CUEPAT.

In 2016, the Canadian Forces considered replacing the red-coloured uniforms worn by the Canadian Rangers with a new red-coloured CADPAT-derived design.

Similar designs

CADPAT was the first digital camouflage pattern to be issued operationally. Many debates speculate the pattern was the direct inspiration for the United States Marine Corps pursuit and adoption of their own camouflage pattern MARPAT when replacing their Battle Dress Uniform and Desert Camouflage Uniform in late 2001 to early 2002. The MARPAT pattern issued in 2001 used the same print screens as the CADPAT TW pattern and the trial pattern for the CADPAT AR pattern.

See also
 List of military clothing camouflage patterns
 Uniforms of the Canadian Armed Forces

References

Further reading

External links

 Clothe the Soldier - Archived website for the Clothe the Soldier, an R&D program that led to CADPAT
 Digital Camouflage History - from Hyperstealth Biotechnology Corporation

Camouflage patterns
Canadian military uniforms
Military camouflage
Military equipment introduced in the 1990s